Santi Marcellino e Pietro is a Neoclassical-style, Roman Catholic church in Imbersago, province of Lecco, region of Lombardy, Italy.

A church at the site was likely present by the 12th or 13th century. However, a map from 1721 shows the church with attached cloisters. In  1789, Luigi Canonica, putatively pupil of Giuseppe Piermarini, was commissioned to enlarge the church, and create a new facade. 

The church has a single nave. The sanctuary is separated from the rest of the nave by a marble balustrade. The main altar, in white marble, was designed and sculpted by Alessandro Verdi. The organ was built by the Serassi family.

References

18th-century Roman Catholic church buildings in Italy
Roman Catholic churches completed in 1789
Churches in the province of Lecco
Neoclassical architecture in Lombardy
Neoclassical church buildings in Italy